Membracis luizae is a species of treehopper described in 2010.

References

Membracinae
Insects described in 2010